Guy Carel Mbenza Mbenza Kamboleke (born 1 April 2000) is a Congolese professional footballer who plays as a forward for Saudi Arabian club Al-Tai, and the Congo national football team.

Club career
On 17 February 2021, Mbenza joined Swiss Challenge League side Stade Lausanne Ouchy until the end of the season.

On 16 July 2022, Mbenza joined Saudi Arabian club Al-Tai on a permanent deal.

International career
Mbenza made his international debut in a 2–0 home loss to Senegal, replacing Césaire Gandzé after 87 minutes.

Career statistics

Club

Notes

International

References

External links
 Guy Mbenza at CAF

2000 births
Living people
Republic of the Congo footballers
Republic of the Congo international footballers
Association football forwards
AC Léopards players
CS La Mancha players
AS Otôho players
Stade Tunisien players
Cercle Brugge K.S.V. players
Royal Antwerp F.C. players
Al-Tai FC players
Tunisian Ligue Professionnelle 1 players
Belgian Pro League players
Saudi Professional League players
Republic of the Congo expatriate footballers
Expatriate footballers in Tunisia
Expatriate footballers in Belgium
Expatriate footballers in Saudi Arabia
Republic of the Congo expatriate sportspeople in Tunisia
Republic of the Congo expatriate sportspeople in Belgium
Republic of the Congo expatriate sportspeople in Saudi Arabia